The Office of Radio and Television of Niger (fr: Office de radiodiffusion et Télévision du Niger), or ORTN, is the state broadcaster of the West African nation of Niger.   ORTN operates the Télé Sahel terrestrial television station (1964), Radio Voix du Sahel radio network(1960), and the TAL TV satellite station(2004).  ORTN is overseen and funded by the Ministry of Culture, Arts & Communication.

In April 2000 the broadcasting sector was completely liberalized and as a result several private television stations were established in Niger.[30] The ORTN reacted to this development by creating a second television program: Tal TV has been broadcasting since 2001. The ORTN has delegated two of the seven members to the Conseil de Presse (Press Council) since it was founded in March 2007. This self-regulatory institution of the Nigerien media has set itself the task of monitoring media ethical standards and is responsible for issuing press cards.

References

External links

African Development Info Database: ORTN.

Broadcasting companies of Niger
Radio in Niger
Nigerien television
Publicly funded broadcasters
Television channels and stations established in 1964
State media